Mekhareg is a town and commune in Laghouat Province, Algeria.

N.B. The Actual Name is "BENACER BENCHOHRA", after a personne [1804 Laghouat (Algeria) - 1884 Damascus (Syria)], who was one of the brave leaders in the resistance to the French Occupation [1]

The actual name was introduced in November 1987, replacing by an ordinance the ancient one.

References

[1] : http://www.aps.dz/algerie/62490-la-resistance-de-bennacer-benchohra-face-au-colonialisme-un-exemple-de-devouement-pour-le-pays

Communes of Laghouat Province